is a Japanese author and emeritus professor of literature at Keio University. She has won the Akutagawa Prize, the Yomiuri Prize, and the Itō Sei Literature Prize.

Early years
Ogino was born as Anna Gaillard in Naka-ku, Yokohama, Kanagawa Prefecture, to a Japanese mother and a French-American father. Her mother, Kinuko Emi, was a prominent abstract painter. Ogino was naturalized during elementary school, and received her undergraduate and master's degree in French literature from Keio University, as well as receiving a scholarship to Paris-Sorbonne University to study Rabelais. In 2002 she became a full professor at Keio.

Career
Ogino began writing in 1983 as text author for comic strips about mermaids. Her 1991 book , a critical novel that compares eminent male Japanese authors to different types of foods, has received scholarly attention for its subversive use of parodic language.

Recognition
 1991 105th Akutagawa Prize (1991上)
 2002 53rd Yomiuri Prize (2001年度)
 2008 19th Itō Sei Literature Prize

Works and translations
 , Bungeishunjū, 1990, 
 , Fukutake Shoten, 
 , Bungeishunjū, 1991, 
 , Bungeishunjū, 2001, 
 , Shueisha, 2007, 
 , Bungeishunjū, 2017, 
 "Mama Drinks Her Tea," trans. Vyjayanthi Ratnam Selinger in More Stories by Japanese Women Writers: An Anthology, ed. Kyoko Selden and Noriko Lippit (M.E. Sharpe, 2011), 102–126.
 "Nue," trans. Amanda C. Seaman. U.S.-Japan Women's Journal 58 (2020): 21–34.

References

External links
 J'Lit | Authors : Anna Ogino | Books from Japan 

Japanese women writers
1956 births
Paris-Sorbonne University alumni
Living people
People from Yokohama
Japanese people of American descent
Japanese people of French descent
Akutagawa Prize winners
Yomiuri Prize winners